Circassia (also spelled as Cherkessia in some sources) or Zichia was a country and a historical region in the  along the northeast shore of the Black Sea. It was conquered and occupied by Russia during the Russian-Circassian War (1763–1864), after which 90% of the Circassian people were either exiled from the region or massacred in the Circassian genocide.

In the Medieval Era, Circassia was nominally ruled by the elected Grand Prince, however, individual principalities and tribes were highly autonomous. In the 18th-19th centuries, a central government began to form. The Circassians also dominated the north of the Kuban river in the early medieval and ancient times, but with the raids of the Mongol Empire, Golden Horde and the Crimean Khanate, they were withdrawn south of the Kuban, and their reduced borders stretched from the Taman Peninsula to North Ossetia. During the Medieval Era, Circassian lords subjugated and vassalized the neighboring Karachay-Balkars and Ossetians. The term Circassia is also used as the collective name of Circassian states established on Circassian territory, such as Zichia.

Legally and internationally, the Treaty of Belgrade of 1739 between Austria and Turkey provided for the recognition of the independence of Eastern Circassia (Kabarda). Both the Russian Empire and the Ottoman Empire recognized it, and the great powers at the time witnessed the treaty. The Congress of Vienna held in the period between 1814-1815 also stipulated the recognition of the independence of Circassia. In 1837, Circassian leaders sent letters to European countries requesting legal recognition. Following this, the United Kingdom recognized Circassia. However, during the Russian-Circassian War, the Russian Empire did not recognize Circassia as an independent region, and treated it as Russian land under rebel occupation, despite having no control or ownership over the region. Russian generals referred to the Circassians not by their ethnic name, but as "mountaineers", “bandits", and "mountain scum".

Although Circassia is the original homeland of the Circassian people, today most Circassians live in exile, following the Circassian genocide.

Etymology 
The words Circassia and Circassian are exonyms, Latinized from the word Cherkess, which is of debated origin. One view is that its root stems from Turkic languages, and that the term means “head choppers” or “warrior killers” accounting for the successful battle practices of the Circassians. There are those who argue that the term comes from Mongolian Jerkes, meaning “one who blocks a path”. Some believe it comes from the ancient Greek name of the region, Siraces. According to another view, its origin is Persian.

In languages spoken geographically close to the Caucasus, the native people originally had other names for the Circassia, but with Russian influence, the name has been settled as Cherkessia/Circassia. It is the same or similar in many world languages that cite these languages.

Circassians themselves don't use the term "Circassia", and refer to their country as Адыгэ Хэку (Adıgə Xəku) or Адыгей (Adıgey).

Another historical name for the country was Zichia (Zyx or the Zygii), who were described by the ancient Greek intellectual Strabo as a nation to the north of Colchis.

Geography 

Circassia was located in Eastern Europe, north of Western Asia, near the northeastern Black Sea coast. Before the Russian conquest of the Caucasus (1763–1864), it covered the entire fertile plateau and the steppe of the northwestern region of the Caucasus, with an estimated population of 1 million.

Circassia's historical great range extended from the Taman Peninsula in the west, to the town of Mozdok in today's North Ossetia–Alania in the east. Historically, Circassia covered the southern half of today's Krasnodar Krai, the Republic of Adygea, Karachay-Cherkessia, Kabardino-Balkaria, and parts of North Ossetia–Alania and Stavropol Krai, bounded by the Kuban River on the north which separated it from the Russian Empire.

On the Black Sea coast, the climate is warm and humid, while being moderate in the lowlands and cooler in the highlands. Most of Circassia is frost free for more than half the year. There are steppe meadows in the plains, beech and oak forests in the foothills, and pine forests and alpine meadows in the mountains.

Sochi is considered by many Circassians as their traditional capital city. According to Circassians, the 2014 Winter Olympic village is built in an area of mass graves of Circassians after their defeat by the Russians in 1864.

Statehood and politics

Institute of the Grand Prince of Circassia 
Between 1427 and 1453, Inal the Great conquered all Circassian principalities and declared himself the Grand Prince of Circassia. Following his death, Circassia was divided again.

The influential principalities of Circassia regularly met to elect a Grand Prince (Пщышхо) among them, with the only condition being that the prince can trace descent from Inal the Great. The existence of such an institute is confirmed by foreign sources. In the eyes of foreign observers, the Grand Prince was considered the king of the Circassians. However, the individual tribes were greatly autonomous and the title was mostly symbolic. In 1237, the Dominican monks Richard and Julian, as part of the Hungarian embassy, visited Circassia and the main city of this country Matrega, located on the Taman Peninsula. In Matrega, the embassy received a good reception from the Grand Prince. 

In the 14th and 15th centuries Italian documents concerning the relationship between the consul of Kafa and Circassia clearly indicate the absolutely special status of the ruler of Circassia. This status allowed the senior prince of Circassia to correspond with the Pope. The letter of Pope John XXII , addressed to the Grand Prince of Zichia (Circassia) Verzacht, dates back to 1333, in which the Roman pontiff thanked the ruler for his diligence in introducing the Catholic faith among his subjects. Verzacht's power status was so high that following his example some other Circassian princes adopted Catholicism.

Confederation 
Circassia traditionally consisted of more than a dozen principalities. Some of these principalities were divided into large feudal estates, characterized by the stability of political status. Within these territories there were numerous feudal possessions of princes (pshi). The Circassian state was a federal state consisting of four levels of government: Village council (чылэ хасэ, made up of village elders and nobles), district council (made up of representatives from 7 neighboring village councils), regional council (шъолъыр хасэ, made up from neighboring district councils), people's council (лъэпкъ зэфэс, where every council had a representative). A central government emerged during the mid to late 1800s. Prior to that, the institute of grand prince was mostly symbolic.

In 1807, Shuwpagwe Qalawebateqo self-proclaimed himself as the leader of the Circassian confederation, and divided Circassia into 12 major regions. In 1827, Ismail Berzeg officially declared the military confederation of the Circassian tribes and by 1839 united a significant part of Circassia under his control. In 1839, the Circassians declared Bighuqal (Anapa) as their new capital and Hawduqo Mansur was declared the new leader of the Circassian Confederation. He kept this title until his death. In 1848, Muhammad Amin was the leader of Circassia. After learning that a warriorly scholar has arrived, thousands of families moved to the Abdzakh region to accept his rule. Seferbiy Zaneqo assumed power after Amin's departure, but died the next year. 

In June 1860, at a congress of representatives of Circassians, a parliament was formed as the highest legislative body of Circassia. Being a political resistance council and the legislature of Circassia, the parliament was established in the capital of Sochi on June 13, 1860 and Qerandiqo Berzeg was elected as the head of the parliament and the nation.

External relations 
Legally and internationally, the Treaty of Belgrade 1739 provided for the recognition of the independence of Eastern Circassia (Kabarda), where both the Russian Empire and the Ottoman Empire recognized it, and the great powers at the time witnessed the treaty. The Congress of Vienna held in the period between 1814-1815 also stipulated the recognition of the independence of Circassia. In 1837, Circassian leaders sent letters to European countries requesting legal recognition. Following this, the United Kingdom recognized Circassia. However, during the Russian-Circassian War, the Russian Empire did not recognize Circassia as an independent region, and treated it as Russian land under rebel occupation, despite having no control or ownership over the region. Russian generals referred to the Circassians not by their ethnic name, but as "mountaineers", “bandits", and "mountain scum".

The Circassian Parliament launched large-scale foreign policy activities. First of all, an official memorandum was drafted addressed to Tsar Alexander II. The text of the memorandum was presented to the tsar by the leaders of the Parliament during the latter's visit to Circassia in September 1861. The Parliament also accepted an appeal to the Ottoman and European governments. Special envoys were sent to Istanbul and London to seek diplomatic and military support. The activities of the Circassian government received the full support of public organizations, so the Circassian Committee of Istanbul and London supported Circassia. Thus, if not de jure, then de facto Circassia acquired the features of a subject of international law.

Relations with the Ottoman Empire 
In the 16th century, the English traveler Edmund Spencer, who traveled to the shores of the Caucasus, quotes a Circassian saying about the Ottoman sultan:Circassian blood flows in the veins of the Sultan. His mother, his harem are Circassian; his slaves are Circassians, his ministers and generals are Circassians. He is the head of our faith and also of our race.

Army 
Circassia for centuries lived under the threat of external invasions, so the whole way of life of the Circassians was militarized. The governor of Astrakhan wrote to Peter I:

Circassia developed the so-called "Culture of War". Honorable combat was a big part of this culture, during hostilities, it was considered strictly unacceptable to set fire to homes or crops, especially bread, even from enemies. It was considered inadmissible to leave the bodies of dead comrades on the battlefield. It was considered a great disgrace in Circassia to fall alive into the hands of the enemy, so Russian officers who later fought in Circassia noted that it was very rare to succeed in capturing Circassians, as they would go as far as suicide. Johann von Blaramberg noted:

The Russian army, after invading Circassia and ethnically cleansing the Circassians in the Circassian genocide, adopted some parts of Circassian military uniforms - from weapons (Shashka and Circassian sabers, daggers, Circassian saddles, Circassian horses) to uniforms (Cherkeska, burqa, papaha).

Known ancient and medieval rulers 
Known rulers of the region include:

 400–383 BC: Hekaktaios
 383–355 BC: Oktamasades
 100s: Stachemfak
 400s: Dawiy
 500s: Bakhsan Dawiqo
 700s–800s: Lawristan
 800s–900s: Weche
 900s: Hapach
 900s–1022: Rededya 
 1200s: Abdunkhan
 1200s–1237: Tuqar
 1237–1239: Tuqbash
 1300s: Verzacht
 1427–1453: Inal the Great
 1470s: Petrezok 
 1530s–1542: Kansavuk

History

Pseudoscientific origin 
Turkish nationalist groups and proponents of modern day Pan-Turkism have claimed that the Circassians are of Turkic origin, but no scientific evidence has been published to support this claim and it has been strongly denied by ethnic Circassians, impartial research, linguists and historians around the world. The Circassian language does not share notable similarities to the Turkish language except for borrowed words. According to various historians, the Circassian origin of the Sind-Meot tribes refutes the claim that the Circassians are of Turkic ethnic origin.

Ancient Era

Maikop Civilization 
Miyequap (Maikop) civilization was established in 3000 BC. Circassians were known by many different names in ancient times. "Kerket" and "Sucha" are examples. In 1200 BC, Circassians fought alongside the Hittites against the Egyptians.

Sindica 

The Sindica state was founded in 500 BC. During this period, Greeks (Greeks) and Sind-Meot tribes lived in Circassia. Under the roof of this state, Sind-Meots in the region became the ancestors of the Circassian people. The Greek poet Hipponaks, who lived in the 5th century BC, and Herodotus later mentioned the Sinds. Strabo also mentions the city of Sindica, located near the Black Sea coast. Information on Sindica has been learned from Greek documents and archaeological finds, and there is not much detail. It is not known exactly when the Sindica State was established, but it is known that the Sindians had a state and trade relations with the Greeks before the establishment of the Greek colonies on the Black Sea coast. It is also known that the kingdom of Sindica was a busy trading state where artists and merchants were accommodated. Circassians could not establish a union for a long time after this state.

Medieval Era 
The most detailed description of medieval Circassia was made by Johannes de Galonifontibus in 1404. From his writing it follows that at the turn of the XIV and XV centuries, Circassia expanded its borders to the north to the mouth of the Don, and he notes that “the city and port of Tana is located in the same country in Upper Circassia, on the Don River, which separates Europe from Asia".  

Feudalism began to emerge in Circassians by the 4th century. As a result of Armenian, Greek and Byzantine influence, Christianity spread throughout the Caucasus between the 3rd and 5th centuries AD. During that period the Circassians (referred to at the time as Kassogs) began to accept Christianity as a national religion, but did not abandon all elements of their indigenous religious beliefs. Circassians established many states, but could not achieve political unity. From around 400 AD wave after wave of invaders began to invade the lands of the Adyghe people, who were also known as the Kasogi (or Kassogs) at the time. They were conquered first by the Bulgars (who originated on the Central Asian steppes). Outsiders sometimes confused the Adyghe people with the similarly named Utigurs (a branch of the Bulgars), and both peoples were sometimes conflated under misnomers such as "Utige". Following the dissolution of the Khazar state, the Adyghe people were integrated around the end of the 1st millennium AD into the Kingdom of Alania. Between the 10th and 13th centuries Georgia had influence on the Adyghe Circassian peoples.

In 1382, Circassian mamluks took the Mamluk throne, the Burji dynasty took over and the Mamluks became a Circassian state. The Mongols, who started invading the Caucasus in 1223, destroyed some of the Circassians and most of the Alans. The Circassians, who lost most of their lands during the ensuing Golden Horde attacks, had to retreat to the back of the Kuban River. In 1395 Circassians fought violent wars against Tamerlane, and although the Circassians won the wars, Tamerlane plundered Circassia.

King Inal the Great 
Inal is called the "Prince of Princes" by Circassians and Abkhazians, because he united all Circassian tribes and established the Circassian state. According to popular belief, Inal is the ancestor of Kabardian, Besleney, Chemguy and Hatuqwai princes.

Inal, who during the 1400s owned land in the Taman peninsula, established an army consisting mostly of the Khegayk tribe and declared that his goal was to unite the Circassians, which were divided into many states at that time, under a single state, and after declaring his own princedom, conquered all of Circassia one by one.

Circassian nobles and princes tried to prevent Inal's rise, but in a battle near the Msimta River, 30 Circassian lords were defeated by Inal and his supporters. Ten of them were executed, while the remaining twenty lords took an oath of allegiance and joined the forces of Inal's new state. Inal, who ruled Western Circassia, established the Kabarda region in Eastern Circassia in 1434 and drove the Crimean Tatar tribes in the Circassian lands to the north of the Kuban River in 1438, and as a result of his effective expansions, he was ruling all of the Circassian land.

The capital of this new Circassian state founded by Inal became the city of Shanjir, built in the Taman region where he was born and raised. Although the exact location of the city of Shanjir is unknown, the most supported theory is that it is the Krasnaya Batareya district, which fits the descriptions of the city made by Klarapoth and Pallas.

Although he united the Circassians, Inal still wanted to include the cousin people, the Abkhaz, in his state. Abkhaz dynasties Chachba and Achba announced that they would side with Inal in a possible war. Inal, who won the war in Abkhazia, officially conquered Northern Abkhazia and the Abkhaz people recognized the rule of Inal, and Inal finalized his rule in Abkhazia. One of the stars on the flag of Abkhazia represents Inal.

Inal divided his lands between his sons and grandchildren in 1453 and died in 1458. Following this, Circassian tribal principalities were established. Some of these are Chemguy founded by Temruk, Besleney founded by Beslan, Kabardia founded by Qabard, and Shapsug founded by Zanoko.

According to the Abkhaz claim, Inal died in North Abkhazia. Although most sources cite this theory, researches and searches in the region have shown that Inal's tomb is not here. According to Russian explorer and archaeologist Evgeniy Dimitrievich Felitsin, Inal's tomb is not in Abkhazia. In a map published in 1882, Felitsin has shown great importance to Inal, and placed his grave in the Ispravnaya region in Karachay-Cherkessia, not in Abkhazia. He added that there are ancient sculptures, mounds, tombs, churches, castles and ramparts in this area, which would be an ideal tomb for someone like Inal.

At the end of the 15th century, a detailed description of Circassia and of its inhabitants was made by Genovese traveller and ethnographer Giorgio Interiano.

Modern Era

Kanzhal 

In 1708, Circassians paid a great tribute to the Ottoman sultan in order to prevent Tatar raids, but the sultan did not fulfill the obligation and the Tatars raided all the way to the center of Circassia, robbing everything they could. For this reason, Kabardian Circassians announced that they would never pay tribute to the Crimean Khan and the Ottoman Sultan again. The Ottomans sent their army of at least 20,000 men to Kabardia under the leadership of the Crimean khan Kaplan-Girey to conquer the Circassians and ordered him collect the tribute. The Ottomans expected an easy victory against the Kabardinians, but the Circassians won because of the strategy set up by the Kazaniko Jabagh.

The Turkish-Crimean army was completely destroyed overnight. The Crimean Khan Kaplan-Giray barely managed to save his life, and was humiliated, all the way to his shoes taken, leaving his brother, son, field tools, tents and personal belongings.

Russo-Circassian War 

In 1714, Peter I established a plan to occupy the Caucasus. Although he was unable to implement this plan, he laid the political and ideological foundation for the occupation to take place. Catherine II started putting this plan into action. The Russian army was deployed on the banks of the Terek River.

The Russian military tried to impose authority by building a series of forts, but these forts in turn became the new targets of raids and indeed sometimes the highlanders actually captured and held the forts. Under Yermolov, the Russian military began using a strategy of disproportionate retribution for raids. Russian troops retaliated by destroying villages where resistance fighters were thought to hide, as well as employing assassinations, kidnappings and the execution of whole families. Because the resistance was relying on sympathetic villages for food, the Russian military also systematically destroyed crops and livestock and killed Circassian civilians. Circassians responded by creating a tribal federation encompassing all tribes of the area. In 1840 Karl Friedrich Neumann estimated the Circassian casualties at around one and a half million. Some sources state that hundreds of thousands of others died during the exodus. Several historians use the phrase "Circassian massacres" for the consequences of Russian actions in the region.

In a series of sweeping military campaigns lasting from 1860 to 1864... the northwest Caucasus and the Black Sea coast were virtually emptied of Muslim villagers. Columns of the displaced were marched either to the Kuban [River] plains or toward the coast for transport to the Ottoman Empire... One after another, entire Circassian tribal groups were dispersed, resettled, or killed en masse

Circassians established an assembly called "Great Freedom Assembly" in the capital city of Shashe (Sochi) on June 25, 1861. Haji Qerandiqo Berzedj was appointed as the head of the assembly. This assembly asked for help from Europe, arguing that they would be forced into exile soon. However, before the result was achieved, Russian General Kolyobakin invaded Sochi and destroyed the parliament and no country opposed this.

In May 1864, a final battle took place between the Circassian army of 20,000 Circassian horsemen and a fully equipped Russian army of 100,000 men. Circassian warriors attacked the Russian army and tried to break through the line, but most were shot down by Russian artillery and infantry. The remaining fighters continued to fight as militants and were soon defeated. All 20,000 Circassian horsemen died in the war. The Russian army began celebrating victory on the corpses of Circassian soldiers, and so May 21, 1864, was officially the end of the war.

Circassian Genocide 

The proposal to deport the Circassians was ratified by the Russian government, and a flood of refugee movements began as Russian troops advanced in their final campaign. Circassians prepared to resist and hold their last stand against Russian military advances and troops. With the refusal to surrender, Circassian civilians were targeted one by one by the Russian military with thousands massacred and the Russians started to raid and burn Circassian villages, destroy the fields to make it impossible to return, cut trees down and drive the people towards the Black Sea coast. 

Although the main target of the genocide was the Circassians, some Abkhaz, Abazin, Chechen, Ossetian and other Muslim Caucasian communities were also affected. Although it is not known exactly how many people are affected, researchers have suggested that at least 75%, 90%, 94%, or 95% -97% (not including the other ethniticies such as Abkhaz) of the ethnic Circassian population are affected. Considering these rates, calculations including those taking into account the Russian government's own archival figures, have estimated a loss 600,000–1,500,000. It is estimated that the population of Kabardins in Circassia was reduced from 500,000 to 35,000; the Abzakhs from 260,000 to 14,600; and the Natukhajs from 240,000 to merely 175 persons. The Shapsugh tribe which numbered some 300,000 were reduced to 3,000 people. Ivan Drozdov, a Russian officer who witnessed the scene at Qbaada in May 1864 as the other Russians were celebrating their victory remarked:

The Ottoman Empire regarded the Adyghe warriors as courageous and experienced. It encouraged them to settle in various near-border settlements of the Ottoman Empire in order to strengthen the empire's borders.

According to Walter Richmond

Circassia was a small independent nation on the northeastern shore of the Black Sea. For no reason other than ethnic hatred, over the course of hundreds of raids the Russians drove the Circassians from their homeland and deported them to the Ottoman Empire. At least 600,000 people lost their lives to massacre, starvation, and the elements while hundreds of thousands more were forced to leave their homeland. By 1864, three-fourths of the population was annihilated, and the Circassians had become one of the first stateless peoples in modern history.

, Georgia was the only country to classify the events as genocide, while Russia actively denies the Circassian genocide, and classifies the events as a simple migration of "undeveloped barbaric peoples". Russian nationalists continue to celebrate the day on May 21 each year as a "holy conquest day", when the Russian Empire's occupation of the Caucasus ended. Circassians commemorate May 21 every year as the Circassian Day of Mourning.

Population
There are twelve historic Adyghe (Circassian: Адыгэ, Adyge) princedoms or tribes of Circassia (three democratic and nine aristocratic); Abdzakh, Besleney, Bzhedug, Hatuqwai, Kabardian, Mamkhegh, Natukhai, Shapsug, Temirgoy, Ubykh, Yegeruqwai and Zhaney.

Today, about 700,000 Circassians remain in historical Circassia in today's Russia. The 2010 Russian Census recorded 718,727 Circassians, of which 516,826 are Kabardians, 124,835 are Adyghe proper, 73,184 are Cherkess and 3,882 Shapsugs. The largest Circassian population resides in Turkey (pop. 1,400,000–6,000,000). A Circassian population also exists in other countries, including Jordan, Syria, Iraq, Iran, Lebanon, Serbia, Egypt and Israel, but is considerably smaller.

National religion 

Circassia gradually went through the following various religions: Paganism, Christianity, and then Islam.

Paganism 

The ancient beliefs of the Circassians were based on animism and magic, within the framework of the customary rules of Xabze. Although the main belief was Monistic-Monotheistic, they prayed using water, fire, plants, forests, rocks, thunder and lightning. They performed their acts of worship accompanied by dance and music in the sacred groves used as temples. An old priest led the ceremony, accompanied by songs of prayer, and supplications. Thus, it was aimed to protect the newborn babies from diseases and the evil eye. Another important aspect was ancestors and honor. Therefore, the goal of man's earthly existence is the perfection of the soul, which corresponds to the maintenance of honour, manifestation of compassion, gratuitous help, which, along with valour, and bravery of a warrior, enables the human soul to join the soul of the ancestors with a clear conscience.

Judaism 
Some Circassian tribes converted to Judaism in the past as a result of the settlement of approximately 20 thousand Jews in 8th-century Circassia, along with the relations established with the Turkic-Jewish Khazar Khaganate. Although Judaism in Circassia eventually assimilated into Christianity and Islam.

Christianity 
It is the tradition of the early church that Christianity made its first appearance in Circassia in the 1st century AD via the travels and preaching of the Apostle Andrew, but recorded history suggests that, as a result of Greek and Byzantine influence, Christianity first spread throughout Circassia between the 3rd and 5th centuries AD. The spread of the Catholic faith was only possible with the Latin Conquest of Constantinople by the crusaders and the establishment of the Latin state. The Catholic religion was adopted by the Circassians following Farzakht, a distinguished figure who greatly contributed to the spread of this religion in his country. The pope sent him a letter in 1333 thanking him for his effort, as an indication of his gratitude. For Circassians, the most important and attractive personality in all Christian teachings was the personality of St. George. They saw in him the embodiment of all the virtues respected in the Caucasus. His name in Circassian is "Aushe-Gerge".

Christianity in Circassia experienced its final collapse in the 18th century when all Circassians accepted Islam. The ex-priests joined the Circassian nobility and were given the name "shogene" (teacher) and over time this name became a surname.

Islam 
A small Muslim community in Circassia has always existed since the Middle Ages, but the widespread of Islam  occurred after 1717. Travelling Sufi preachers and the increasing threat of an invasion from Russia helped expedite the spread of Islam in Circassia. Circassian scholars educated in the Ottoman Empire boosted the spread of Islam.

Circassian nationalism

Under Russian and Soviet rule, ethnic and tribal divisions between Circassians were promoted, resulting in several different statistical names being used for various parts of the Circassian people (Adyghes, Cherkess, Kabardins, Shapsugs). Consequently, Circassian nationalism has developed. Circassian nationalism is the desire among Circassians all over the world to preserve their culture and save their language from extinction, achieve full international recognition of the Circassian genocide, globally revive Adyghe Xabze among Circassians, return to their homeland Circassia, and ultimately reestablish an independent Circassian state. There is also an effort among Circassians to unite under the name Circassian (Adyghe) in Russian Censuses to reflect and revive the concept of the Circassian nation. The overwhelming majority of the diaspora already tends to call itself "only Circassian".

See also

 Emanne Beasha
 Circassian Assembly
 Circassian beauties
 Circassian coast
 Circassian Day of Mourning
 Circassian diaspora
 Circassian genocide
 Circassian language
 Circassian music
 Circassian nationalism
 Circassian people
 Russian–Circassian War

References

Citations

Cited works 
 
 
 
 *  12 апреля 2011. — Часть 1.; 29 апреля 2011. — Часть 2.; 29 апреля 2011. — Часть 3.; 29 апреля 2011. — Часть 4..

General references 
 Bell, James Stanislaus. Journal of a residence in Circassia during the years 1837, 1838, and 1839 .
 Bullough, Oliver. Let Our Fame Be Great: Journeys Among the Defiant People of the Caucasus. Allen Lane, 2010. .
 Jaimoukha, Amjad. The Circassians: A Handbook, London: Routledge, New York: Routledge & Palgrave, 2001. .
 Jaimoukha, Amjad. Circassian Culture and Folklore: Hospitality, Traditions, Cuisine, Festivals and Music. Bennett & Bloom, 2010. .
 Kaziev, Shapi, and Igor Karpeev (Повседневная жизнь горцев Северного Кавказа в XIX в.). Everyday Life of the Caucasian Highlanders: The 19th Century. Moscow: Molodaya Gvardiy, 2003. 
 King, Charles. The Ghost of Freedom: A History of the Caucasus. Oxford University Press, 2008. .
 Levene, Mark. Genocide in the Age of the Nation-State. Volume II: The Rise of the West and the Coming of Genocide. London: I. B. Tauris, 2005. .
 Richmond, Walter. The Circassian Genocide, Rutgers University Press, 2013. .

External links 
 

Geography of North Caucasus
Former countries in Europe
Russian Civil War
Tributary states of the Ottoman Empire